Apoliticism is apathy or antipathy towards all political affiliations. A person may be described as apolitical if they are uninterested or uninvolved in politics. Being apolitical can also refer to situations in which people take an unbiased position in regard to political matters. The Collins English Dictionary defines apolitical as "politically neutral; without political attitudes, content, or bias."

History

During classical antiquity, the Epicureans assumed disengagement from the life of the city as a doctrinal position. Seeking pleasure in the absence of suffering for the body and trouble for the soul, they saw political activity as a source of unnecessary stress that would not lead to these ends.

However, they were not strictly apolitical and participated when political activity would bring them pleasure or aid in the avoidance of their suffering.

Criticisms 
Apoliticism as an ideology is criticised for its claim that it is possible to remain impartial. Many progressive theorists argue that by ignoring the political nature of everyday life, "neutral" individuals make a choice to ignore oppressive regimes and practises, which manifests as an acceptance and passive approval of them. The following instance is indicative of this rhetoric:"all men are political beings […] Every man, in as much as he is active, i.e. living, contributes to modifying the social environment in which he develops (to modifying certain of its characteristics or to preserving others); in other words, he tends to establish ‘norms’, rules of living and behaviour."

- Antonio Gramsci Selections from Prison Notebooks: State and Civil Society 1971
Another example of this is the political slogan: The personal is political. The phrase was popularised by radical feminist Carol Hanisch in her essay of the same name, which analyses the ways in which the personal problems of women are actually political ones.

See also

References

Citations

Sources
 Rabin, Jack; Bowman, James S. (1984). Politics and Administration: Woodrow Wilson and American Public Administration. Public Administration and Public Policy. 22. New York: Dekker.

External links 

Politics by issue
Political spectrum